Westwick is a village in County Durham, in England. The population of the civil parish was less than 100. Details are maintained in the parish of Whorlton.  It is situated to the east of Barnard Castle near the River Tees.

References

External links

Villages in County Durham